Karachi Fish Harbour is located in Karachi, Sindh, Pakistan. Over 90 percent of the Pakistan's fish and seafood catch and exports pass through the harbour.

In 2020, Kemari District was carved out from Karachi West District. So Karachi Fish Harbour ended up being part of Kemari District.

See also 
 List of fish harbours of Pakistan

References

External links
 Sindh Coastal and Inland Community Development Project

Ports in Karachi
Economy of Karachi
Fish harbours of Pakistan

Keamari District
Towns in Karachi